Bonnie Brown may refer to:

 Bonnie Brown (politician) (born 1941), Canadian Member of Parliament
 Bonnie Brown (musician) (1938–2016), American singer
 Bonnie Blair Brown (born 1947), American actress